Eugenio is an Italian and Spanish masculine given name deriving from the Greek 'Eugene'. The name is Eugénio in Portuguese and Eugênio in Brazilian Portuguese.

The name's translated literal meaning is well born, or of noble status.  Similar derivative names such as Gino come from Eugenio, or Eugene. Similar names include Eugenios, Efigenio, Eugine and Eugenius.

People

Aristocracy

 Eugenio Alfonso Carlo Maria Giuseppe, Prince of Savoy-Genoa
 Eugenio Brunetta d'Usseaux, Italian nobleman
 Eugenio Consolini, Italian aristocrat
 Eugenio da Palermo, admiral of the Kingdom of Sicily
 Eugenio Daza, Filipino principale, educator and military leader 
 Eugenio Lascorz, pretender to a royal house of Byzantium

Business

 Eugenios Eugenidis, Greek shipping magnate, benefactor and philanthropist 
 Eugenio Garza Lagüera, Mexican businessman and philanthropist 
 Eugenio Garza Sada, Mexican businessman and philanthropist
 Eugenio Lopez III, current Chairman and Chief Executive Officer of ABS-CBN
 Eugenio Lopez, Jr., former Chairman Emeritus of ABS-CBN Broadcasting Corporation
 Eugenio Lopez, Sr., founder of the Manila Chronicle and Chronicle Broadcasting Network
 Eugenio Mendoza, Venezuelan business tycoon

Film, journalism and television

 Eugenio Abunda, Jr., Filipino television host, publicist, talent manager and celebrity endorser
 Eugenio Batres Garcia, Nicaraguan journalist, political commentator, newscaster and writer
 Eugenio Bava, Italian cinematographer
 Eugenio Centenaro Kerrigan, Italian Brazilian film director and screenwriter
 Eugenio Derbez, Mexican comedy actor and Formula Three auto driver
 Eugenio Martín, Spanish film director and screenwriter
 Eugenio Siller, Mexican actor and singer

Fine arts

 Eugenio Caxés, Spanish painter of the Baroque
 Eugenio Da Venezia, Italian painter
 Eugenio Granell, Spanish Surrealist painter
 Eugenio Tavolara, Sardinian artist

Music

 Eugenio Cavallini, Italian conductor, composer, violinist, and violist
 Eugenio Colombo, Italian saxophonist and flautist
 Eugenio Fernandi, Italian tenor
 Eugenio Finardi, Italian singer, songwriter, guitarist and keyboardist
 Eugenio Giraldoni, Italian operatic baritone
 Eugenio Toussaint, Mexican composer, arranger and jazz musician.

Politics
 Eugenio Aguilar, President of El Salvador, 1946-1948
 Eugenio Alvarez (1918–1976), New York assemblyman
 Eugenio Arbones, Spanish physician and socialist politician
 Eugenio Bergamasco (1858–1940), Italian engineer and politician
 Eugenio Cambaceres, Argentine writer and politician
 Eugenio Elorduy Walther, Mexican politician
 Eugenio Fernández Cerra, former Puerto Rican Senator
 Eugenio Hernández Flores, Mexican politician
 Eugenio Manuvakola, the leader of UNITA Renovada
 Eugenio Martínez, member of the anti-Castro movement in the early 1960s
 Eugenio Perente-Ramos, founder of the National Labor Federation (NATLFED)
 Eugenio Pérez, Filipino politician
 Eugenio Rodríguez Vega, Costa Rican writer, politician, and historian
 Eugenio Tandonnet, French utopian socialist
 Eugenio Tarabini, late Italian politician and lawyer

Religion
 Eugênio de Araújo Sales (1920–2012), Roman Catholic cardinal from Brazil
 Eugenio Duarte, Church of the Nazarene minister
 Eugenio Kincaid, American Baptist missionary
 Felix Eugenio Mkhori, Malawian Roman Catholic prelate 
 Luíz Eugênio Pérez, Brazilian Roman Catholic prelate 
 Pope Pius XII, born Eugenio Pacelli
 Eugénio Salessu, was the Roman Catholic bishop of the Roman Catholic Diocese of Malanje, Angola
 Eugenio Scarpellini, Italian priest
 Eugenio Tosi, Italian cardinal
 Eugenius Vulgarius, Italian priest and poet
 Eugenio Zolli, Chief Rabbi of Rome

Sciences, technology and mathematics

 Eugenio Barsanti, Italian engineer
 Eugenio Beltrami, Italian mathematician
 Eugenio Berríos, Chilean biochemist
 Eugenio Calabi, Jewish Italian American mathematician
 Eugenio Cantatore, Italian Dutch electrical engineer
 Eugenio Curiel, Italian physicist
 Eugenio de Bellard Pietri, speleologist
 Eugenio Elia Levi, Italian mathematician
 Eugenio Giuseppe Togliatti, Italian mathematician
 Eugenio Oñate Ibañez de Navarra, Spanish engineer

Sports

 Eugenio Amore, Italian beach volleyball player
 Eugenio Balanqué, retired Cuban decathlete
 Eugenio Canfari, early Italian football player
 Eugenio Castellotti (1930–1957), Italian Formula One driver
 Eugenio Castellucci, Argentine football player
 Eugenio Corini, Italian association football coach and former player
 Eugenio Fascetti, Italian professional football coach and a former player
 Eugenio Faxas, Dominican golfer
 Eugenio Fernando Bila, Mozambican football player
 Eugênio German, Brazilian chess master
 Eugenio Gestri, Italian professional road bicycle racer
 Eugenio Hilario, Spanish professional association football player
 Eugenio Konrad, Hungarian footballer and manager
 Eugenio Lamanna, Italian professional football player
 Eugenio Lazzarini, Italian former Grand Prix motorcycle road racing World Champion
 Eugenio Leal, retired Spanish footballer
 Eugenio Mena, Chilean left defender or midfielder
 Eugenio Monti, Italian bobsledder
 Eugenio Morel, retired professional footballer
 Eugenio Neves, Portuguese footballer
 Eugenio Peralta, Paraguayan footballer
 Eugenio Rizzolini, retired Italian professional footballer
 Eugênio Rômulo Togni, Brazilian footballer
 Eugenio Serrano, Spanish handball player
 Eugenio Siena, Italian race-car driver
 Eugenio Staccione, Italian professional footballer
 Eugenio Suárez, Major League Baseball Player
 Eugenio Suárez Santos, Spanish professional footballer
 Eugenio Szabados, Hungarian-Italian chess master
 Eugenio Torres Villarreal, Mexican Luchador, or professional wrestler, television host and rapper
 Eugenio Torre, Filipino chess grandmaster
 Eugenio Vélez, Major League Baseball player
 Eugene Currie, Rugby league player

Writing
 Eugenio Agacino y Martínez, Spanish sailor and writer
 Eugenio Barba, Italian author and theatre director based in Denmark
 Eugenio Corti, Italian writer
 Eugenio d'Ors, Spanish Catalan writer, essayist, journalist, philosopher and art critic
 Eugénio de Andrade, Portuguese poet
 Eugénio de Castro, Portuguese writer and author
 Eugenio de Ochoa, Spanish author, writer and translator
 Eugénio de Paula Tavares, Cape Verdean poet
 Eugenio Fuentes, Spanish novelist
 Eugenio Mimica Barassi (1949–2021), Chilean writer
 Eugenio Montale, Italian poet, prose writer, editor and translator, winner of the Nobel Prize for Literature
 Eugenio Montejo, Venezuelan poet and essay writer
 Eugenio Scalfari, Italian journalist
 Eugenio Sellés, Spanish writer, journalist, playwright and politician

Other

 Eugenio Balzan
 Eugenio Biagini, Italian historian
 Eugenio Caballero, Mexican production designer
 Eugenio Calò (1905–1943), Italian partisan
 Eugenio Coşeriu, Romanian-German linguist
 Eugenio Courret, French photographer
 Eugenio de Salazar, Spanish explorer
 Eugenio Domingo Solans, Spanish economist
 Eugenio Donato, Armenian-Italian deconstructionist, literary critic, and “philosophical critic”
 Eugenio Espejo, medical pioneer, writer and lawyer of mestizo origin in colonial Ecuador
 Eugenio Garin, Italian philosopher and Renaissance historian
 Eugenio Gerardo Lobo, Spanish soldier and poet 
 Eugenio Lopez (disambiguation)
 Eugenio López Alonso, founder of the Colección Jumex
 Eugenio María de Hostos, Puerto Rican educator, philosopher, intellectual, lawyer, sociologist and independence advocate
 Eugenio Miccini, Italian artist and writer
 Eugenio Raúl Zaffaroni, Argentine lawyer
 Eugenio Recuenco, Spanish photographer
 Eugenio Rignano, Italian philosopher
 Eugenio Sanz-Orozco Mortera, martyr of the Spanish civil war
 Eugenio Sicomoro, Italian comic book artist
 Eugenio Trías Sagnier, Spanish philosopher
 Eugenio Vegas Latapie, Spanish monarchist writer, activist and conspirator

See also
 Eugene (given name)
 Eugenia (name)

Given names
Italian masculine given names
Spanish masculine given names